James Robb may refer to:

James Robb (politician) (1859–1929), Canadian politician
James Robb (RAF officer) (1895–1968), RAF commander
James Robb (philosopher) (1918–1993), professor of philosophy at Marquette University
Jim Robb (born 1933), Canadian watercolour painter
J. Hampden Robb (1846–1911), New York politician
James Robb (golfer) (1878–1949), Scottish amateur golfer
James Robb (pathologist), American pathologist